Krystyna Ewa Ozga (born 20 June 1944 in Częstochowa) is a Polish politician. She was elected to Sejm on 25 September 2005, getting 8250 votes in 10 Piotrków Trybunalski district as a candidate from the Polish People's Party list.

She was also a member of Sejm 1993-1997 and Sejm 2001-2005.

See also
Members of Polish Sejm 2005-2007

External links
Krystyna Ozga - parliamentary page - includes declarations of interest, voting record, and transcripts of speeches.

Members of the Polish Sejm 2005–2007
Members of the Polish Sejm 1993–1997
Members of the Polish Sejm 2001–2005
Women members of the Sejm of the Republic of Poland
Polish People's Party politicians
1944 births
Living people
20th-century Polish women politicians
21st-century Polish women politicians
Members of the Polish Sejm 2011–2015